A charitable gift annuity is a gift vehicle that falls in the category of planned giving. It involves a contract between a donor and a charity, whereby the donor transfers cash or property to the charity in exchange for a partial tax deduction and a lifetime stream of annual income from the charity.  When the donor dies, the charity keeps the gift.

The amount of the income stream is determined by many factors including the donor's age and the policy of the charity. Most charities in the United States use payout rates defined by the American Council on Gift Annuities.

References

External links
 The American Council on Gift Annuities
 Annuity.com Charitable Gift Annuities

Charities